Philip Nicolas Nielsen (born ) is a Danish male  track cyclist, riding for the national team. He competed in the 1 km time trial event at the 2010 UCI Track Cycling World Championships.

References

External links
 Profile at cyclingarchives.com

1987 births
Living people
Danish track cyclists
Danish male cyclists
Place of birth missing (living people)